Robert Thum is a male former table tennis player from Austria.

Table tennis career
From 1928 to 1932 he won five medals in singles, doubles, and team events in the World Table Tennis Championships.

The five World Championship medals included a gold medal in the doubles at the 1928 World Table Tennis Championships with Alfred Liebster.

See also
 List of table tennis players
 List of World Table Tennis Championships medalists

References

Austrian male table tennis players